Maplebeck is a village in Nottinghamshire, England. It is located 6 miles north of Southwell, and is part of the civil parish of Winkburn. It is in the civil parish of Caunton. It is one of only five villages in England to have a church dedicated to St Radegund and it is also one of only 51 Thankful Villages in England and Wales – those rare places that were spared fatalities in the Great War of 1914 to 1918.
The parish church of St Radegund was extensively restored in 1898.

Notable buildings
Low Farmhouse, Church Lane 17th century
Maplebeck House, Main Street Early 19th century
Maplebeck Farmhouse, Main Street 1729
St Radegund's Church, Maplebeck 13th century onwards
Old Vicarage, architect Thomas Chambers Hine 1849
Primitive Methodist Chapel 1868
Village Hall, architect Marsh Grochowski 2015

References

External links

Villages in Nottinghamshire
Newark and Sherwood